Bokermannohyla ravida is a species of frogs in the family Hylidae.

It is endemic to Presidente Olegário, Brazil.
Its natural habitats are subtropical or tropical dry forests, moist savanna, subtropical or tropical moist shrubland, and rivers.
It is threatened by habitat loss for agriculture (crops and livestock), logging and agricultural pollution.

References

ravida
Endemic fauna of Brazil
Frogs of South America
Amphibians described in 2001
Taxonomy articles created by Polbot